Windmills of the Gods is a 1988 American two-part television miniseries directed by Lee Philips and starring Jaclyn Smith and Robert Wagner. It is based on the 1987 novel of the same name written by Sidney Sheldon, who also served as executive producer.  It was broadcast in two parts by CBS on February 7, 1988, and February 9, 1988. It was the fifth miniseries based on a Sheldon book, and the third adaptation starring Jaclyn Smith.

Cast
 Jaclyn Smith as Mary Ashley
 Robert Wagner	as Mike Slade
 Franco Nero as President of Romania Alex Ionescu
 Christopher Cazenove as Dr. Louis Desforges
 Michael Moriarty as President of United States Paul Ellison
 Ian McKellen as Chairman
 Ruby Dee as Dorothy, Mary Ashley's Secretary 
 Susan Tyrrell	as Neusa Muñoz Angel
 Jeffrey DeMunn as Stanton Rogers
 David Ackroyd	as Dr. Edward Ashley
 Stephanie Faracy as Florence Schiffer
 Ari Meyers as Beth Ashley
 Richard K. Olsen as Ben Cohn
 Betsy Palmer as Mrs. Hart Brisbane
 John Pleshette as CIA Agent Eddie Maltz
 John Standing	as Sir George
 J.T. Walsh as Colonel Bill McKinney
 Jean-Pierre Aumont
 Lisa Pelikan as Hannah Murphy, American Girl Jailed In Romania
 Nicholas Ball as Harry Lantz

References

External links

1988 films
1980s spy films
American spy films
Films based on American novels
Films set in Romania
1980s American television miniseries
English-language television shows
Television shows based on American novels
Espionage television series
Television shows set in Europe
Television series by ITC Entertainment
Films directed by Lee Philips
Films with screenplays by John Gay (screenwriter)
Adaptations of works by Sidney Sheldon
ITC Entertainment films
1988 television films
1980s English-language films
1980s American films